In Norse mythology, Dökkálfar ("Dark Elves") and Ljósálfar ("Light Elves") are two contrasting types of elves; the dark elves dwell within the earth and have a dark complexion, while the light elves live in Álfheimr, and are "fairer than the sun to look at". The Ljósálfar and the Dökkálfar are attested in the Prose Edda, written in the 13th century by Snorri Sturluson, and in the late Old Norse poem Hrafnagaldr Óðins. Scholars have produced theories about the origin and implications of the dualistic concept.

Attestations

Prose Edda
In the Prose Edda, the Dökkálfar and the Ljósálfar are attested in chapter 17 of the book Gylfaginning. In the chapter, Gangleri (the king Gylfi in disguise) asks the enthroned figure of High what other "chief centres" there are in the heavens outside of the spring Urðarbrunnr. Gangleri responds that there are many fine places in heaven, including a place called Álfheimr (Old Norse 'Elf Home' or 'Elf World'). High says that the Ljósálfar live in Álfheimr, while the Dökkálfar dwell underground and look—and particularly behave—quite unlike the Ljósálfar. High describes the Ljósálfar as "fairer than the sun to look at", while the Dökkálfar are "blacker than pitch".

As chapter 17 continues, Gangleri asks what will protect the beautiful hall of Gimlé, previously described as "the southernmost end of heaven", when the fires of Surtr "burn heaven and earth" (Ragnarök). High responds that there are in fact other heavens. The first called Andlàngr, he says, is "south of and above this heaven of ours" and "we believe" Gimlé is located in the third heaven "still further above that one", Víðbláinn. High adds that "we believe it is only light-elves who inhabit these places for the time being".

Hrafnagaldr Óðins
There occurs an additional mention of the dökkálfar in the late Old Norse poem Hrafnagaldr Óðins ("Odin's Raven-galdr"), stanza 25.

Theories and interpretations
As the concept is only recorded in Gylfaginning and the late poem Hrafnagaldr Óðins, it is unclear whether the distinction between the two types of elves originated with Snorri, or if he was merely recounting a concept already developed.

Question of Christian influence
The sub-classification perhaps resulted from Christian influence, by way of importation of the concept of good and evil and angels of light and darkness. Anne Holtsmark aired this view, though with some reservation, since "good vs. evil" dualism is not confined to Christian thinking. Aside from some additional observations to encourage the hypothesis, Holtsmark has been credited with demonstrating that Snorri borrowed from Christian writings, specifically that "Snorri’s description of Víðbláinn [the third heaven populated by light-elves] was almost certainly influenced by (and possibly based on) the account of the angels in the Elucidarius."

Dissenters of the view that the dark and light elves were a later invention, such as Rudolf Simek and Gabriel Turville-Petre, feel rather that "dark" and "light" aspects of the same beings not inherently unlikely, death and fertility cults often being closely related.

Dwarfs
Since the Prose Edda describes the dökkálfar as being  dwellers, they may be dwarfs under another name, in the opinion of a number of scholars such as John Lindow.

The Prose Edda also uniquely mentions the svartálfar ('black elves'), but there are reasons to believe these also refer to merely dwarfs.

Consequently, Lindow and other commentators have remarked that there may not have been any distinction intended between dark-elves and black-elves by those who coined and used those terms. Lotte Motz's paper on elves  commingles, and hence equates "dark-elves" and "black-elves" from the outset.

Grimm's trinity

Jacob Grimm surmised that the proto-elf was probably a "light-colored, white, good spirit" while the dwarfs may have been conceived as "black spirits" by relative comparison. But the "two classes of creatures were getting confounded", and there arose a need to coin the term "light-elf" (ljósálfar, or hvítálfar—"white elves") to refer to the "elves proper". This was counterpart to the "dark-elf" (dökkálfar, or svartálfar—"black elves").

Preferring it over duality, Grimm postulated three kinds of elves (ljósálfar, dökkálfar, svartálfar) present in Norse mythology.

But Grimm's "tripartite division" (as Shippey calls it) faced "trouble" in Snorri's statement that dark-elves were pitch-black, as this would lead to the "first reduction" that "dark-elves = black-elves". As a solution, Grimm "pronounce[es] Snorri's statement fallacious", and hypothesizes that "dark elves" were not really 'dark' but rather 'dingy' or 'pale'. And while conceding that "such a Trilogy still [lacks] decisive proof," draws parallels from the white, brown and black subterranean in Pomeranian legend, and the white, pale, and black troops of spirits come to claim souls in the tale of Solomon and Marcolf.

See also 
 Classifications of fairies
 Sundering of the Elves in J. R. R. Tolkien's legendarium
 Svartálfar

Notes

Explanatory notes

Citations

References

 

  
  

  (Ph.D. thesis, University of Glasgow)

 

 

 (edition cited for chapter numbering by Faulkes)

Elves